Beatrice Clare Dunkel (born Clare Damaris Bastin; pen names, Mo Hayder and Theo Clare; 2 January 1962 – 27 July 2021) was a British author. Earlier in her life she worked as an actress and model under the name Candy Davis. She went on to write novels as Mo Hayder. One forthcoming book, The Book of Sand, will be published in 2022 under the name Theo Clare. She won an Edgar Award in 2012. Her best-known work was Birdman, which was followed by a sequel, The Treatment.

Early life
Born in Essex on 2 January 1962, Hayder grew up in Loughton as the daughter of John Bastin, an astrophysicist, and Susan Hollins, a teacher. She had a younger brother, Richard. She left school and home for London shortly before her 16th birthday. Hayder was educated at The American University and Bath Spa University.

Acting and modelling career
As Candy Davis, she won the Miss Nude beauty pageant in 1982 and became a Page 3 model. As an actress, her first credit was as a stripper in an episode of Minder although her best known role was playing secretary Miss Belfridge in the BBC sitcom Are You Being Served? in the final two series from 1983 to 1985. She also appeared in the music video for the ABC song "Poison Arrow".

After (in her own words) "a wild child phase" and a brief marriage to Gary Olsen she emigrated at 25 to Japan where she became a teacher of English as a foreign language in Tokyo. She was also a waitress at a nightclub and an amateur filmmaker.

Writing career
Hayder sent the manuscript of her first book to several agents. To her surprise she was accepted by leading literary agent Jane Gregory who secured her an offer of nearly £200,000 from Transworld Publishers for a two-book deal. Patrick Janson-Smith of Transworld described the manuscript at the 1998 Frankfurt Book Fair as one of the most powerful and violent books he had come across, "a completely gripping story with believable characters". This debut novel, Birdman, was published in December 1999 and was an international bestseller. Her second novel, The Treatment, was a Sunday Times bestseller and won the 2002 WH Smith Thumping Good Read Award.

Her third novel, Tokyo, was published in May 2004 and was another Sunday Times bestseller. Tokyo was published as The Devil of Nanking in the United States in March 2005. Pig Island was her fourth best seller, published in April 2006. Pig Island was nominated for both a Barry Award for Best British crime novel, and a CWA dagger. Her fifth book, Ritual was the first in "The Walking Man" series, and was nominated for CWA Ian Fleming Steel Dagger award. Skin is the second book in The Walking Man series, and was released in early 2009. Gone, the third book in the series, was released in February 2011. Gone won the Edgar Award for Best Novel. Her novel Hanging Hill was published 2011, Poppet in 2013, and Wolf in 2014.

Her novels were controversial when published. Birdman was seen as violent and disturbing. Her second novel, The Treatment tackled themes of paedophilia. The San Francisco Chronicle called the novel a "disturbing journey into the pedophile mind".

Hayder also wrote the screenplay for De Behandeling (2014) which was a Belgian film of an adaptation of The Treatment.

Shortly before her death, she completed a new novel The Book of Sand, a speculative thriller written under the pseudonym Theo Clare, which was published in 2022.

Personal life
In 1985, she married the actor Gary Olsen, later the male lead in 2point4 children. The couple divorced in 1990.

Hayder lived in Cheltenham, England with her second husband, Bob Randall, a retired police sergeant whom she married in 2021. She had one daughter.

She died on 27 July 2021 from complications of motor neurone disease, aged 59, having been diagnosed the previous December.

Bibliography

Jack Caffery series
Birdman (2000)
The Treatment (2001)
Ritual (2008)
Skin (2009)
Gone (2010)
Poppet (2013)
Wolf (2014)

Stand-alone novels
Tokyo (2004), also published as The Devil of Nanking (2010)
Pig Island (2006)
Hanging Hill (2011)

Writing as Theo Clare
The Book of Sand (2022)
The Book of Clouds (2023)

Filmography

Television

Film

References

External links

Mo Hayder at Gregory & Company Authors' Agents
 

1962 births
2021 deaths
People from Essex
21st-century English novelists
American University School of Communication alumni
Alumni of Bath Spa University
English crime fiction writers
Edgar Award winners
Women mystery writers
21st-century English women writers
English women novelists
Neurological disease deaths in England
Deaths from motor neuron disease
21st-century pseudonymous writers
Pseudonymous women writers
20th-century English actresses
Actresses from London
English television actresses
English female models
Glamour models
Page 3 girls